The paired gubernacula (from Ancient Greek κυβερνάω = pilot, steer) also called the caudal genital ligament, are embryonic structures which begin as undifferentiated mesenchyme attaching to the caudal end of the gonads (testes in males and ovaries in females).

Structure
The gubernaculum is present only during the development of the reproductive system. It is later replaced by distinct vestiges in males and females.The gubernaculum arises in the upper abdomen from the lower end of the gonadal ridge and helps guide the testis in its descent to the inguinal region.

Males 
 The upper part of the gubernaculum degenerates.
 The lower part persists as the gubernaculum testis ("scrotal ligament"). This ligament secures the testis to the most inferior portion of the scrotum, tethering it in place and limiting the degree to which the testis can move within the scrotum.
 Cryptorchidism (undescended testes) are observed in INSL3-null male mice. This implicates INSL3 as a key hormone in the growth and differentiation of the gubernaculum to allow transabdominal migration. Higher testicular temperatures associated with cryptorchidism is associated with reduced fertility.

Females 
 The gubernaculum has two vestigial remnants in females, the ovarian ligament and the round ligament of the uterus (ligamentum teres uteri) which respectively serve to support the ovaries and uterus in the pelvis.
 Development of the gubernaculum in female mice overexpressing INSL3 causes descended ovaries and reduced fertility. This ovarian descent is more pronounced by the additional administration of dihydrotestosterone, which suppresses development of the cranial suspensory ligament. Therefore, maintenance of the cranial suspensory ligament prevents abdominal translocation of the ovaries.

Development 
As the scrotum and labia majora form in males and females respectively, the gubernaculum aids in the descent of the gonads (both testes and ovaries).

The testes descend to a greater degree than the ovaries and ultimately pass through the inguinal canal into the scrotum. The mechanism of this movement is still debated.

History 
The gubernaculum was first described by John Hunter in 1762. The term comes from Ancient Greek meaning to steer, pilot or the rudder or helm.

See also 
 Canal of Nuck

References

External links
  - "Inguinal Region, Scrotum and Testes: The Scrotal Ligament"

Abdomen
Embryology of urogenital system